Samvel Manukyan (born 12 October 1974) is an Armenian Greco-Roman wrestler. He competed at the 1996 Summer Olympics in the men's 68 kg division, coming in 10th place. Samvel is the younger brother of Olympic medalist wrestler Mkhitar Manukyan.

References

External links
 

1974 births
Living people
Sportspeople from Gyumri
Armenian male sport wrestlers
Olympic wrestlers of Armenia
Wrestlers at the 1996 Summer Olympics